"C'mon N' Ride It (The Train)" is a song by American Florida-based musical group Quad City DJ's, released in February 1996 as a single from their debut album, Get On Up and Dance (1996). It is based on a sample of Barry White's 1974 main theme from soundtrack to the film Together Brothers. The song peaked at number three on the US Billboard Hot 100 and reached the top 40 in Australia and New Zealand. It was ranked the number-one song of 1996 by Village Voice magazine, and in 2010, Pitchfork Media included the song as one of their "Ten Actually Good 90s Jock Jams". In 2022, Rolling Stone ranked it number 86 in their list of "200 Greatest Dance Songs of All Time". The song is also used in a wide variety of sports events.

Critical reception
Larry Flick from Billboard commented, "Don'tcha want another booty jam? Sure, ya do—especially if it jiggles with the kind of infectious chorus that this ditty has. This is one of those records that requires the mind to be turned off. The second you start to take all the double-entendre train/ride references too seriously, you are likely to get agitated. Take this for what it is: a cute moment that is good for a quiet chuckle and a wiggle." Peter Miro from Cash Box wrote in his review of the Get On Up and Dance album, that singles like "C'mon N' Ride It (The Train)" "are Quad City principals C.C. and Jay-Ski's infectious contribution to a can't-keep-still mandate." James Hamilton from Music Week'''s RM'' Dance Update described the song as a "Tag Team 'Whoomp!'-type raggeoly rapped and chanted frenetic corny 0-135.8bpm jump around."

Track listing
 "C'mon N' Ride It (The Train)" (Club mix)	- 7:31
 "C'mon N' Ride It (The Train)" (Original mix) - 4:06
 "C'mon N' Ride It (The Train)" (Railroad mix) - 6:05
 "C'mon N' Ride It (The Train)" (Instrumental) - 6:07
 "C'mon N' Ride It (The Train)" (A Cappella) - 6:15

Charts

Weekly charts

Year-end charts

Certifications

Release history

References

1996 debut singles
1996 songs
Big Beat Records (American record label) singles
Songs about dancing